The  Dynamic Invocation Interface (DII)  is an API which allows dynamic construction of CORBA object invocations. It is used at compile time when a client does not have knowledge about the object it wants to invoke. With this interface an argument list is marshalled, a function is named, and a request for service is sent to the object server. DII will usually have an asynchronous mode of 
The following types of applications would require or benefit from DII: browsers for CORBA services, application browsers, bridges (protocol converters), applications accessing huge numbers of different interfaces, monitoring applications.

DII also provides a deferred synchronous invocation. Deferred synchronous invocations are submitted without having to wait for a response. This is similar to a one-way operation except return values and out parameters are possible, but must be polled for.

External links
http://www.cuj.com/documents/s=7981/cujcexp2007vinoski/
https://web.archive.org/web/20041205190741/http://e-docs.bea.com/tuxedo/tux80/creclien/dii.htm#1012539

Common Object Request Broker Architecture